The 1959 Boston University Terriers football team was an American football team that represented Boston University as an independent during the 1959 NCAA University Division football season. In its third season under head coach Steve Sinko, the team compiled a 4–5 record and was outscored by a total of 150 to 102.

Schedule

References

Boston University
Boston University Terriers football seasons
Boston University Terriers football